Jerzy Szymczyk (30 September 1942 – 23 October 2016) was a Polish volleyball player. He competed in the men's tournament at the 1968 Summer Olympics.

References

1942 births
2016 deaths
Polish men's volleyball players
Olympic volleyball players of Poland
Volleyball players at the 1968 Summer Olympics
People from Piotrków County